Georges River  is a community in the Canadian province of Nova Scotia, located in the Cape Breton Regional Municipality on Cape Breton Island.

References
Georges River on Destination Nova Scotia

Communities in the Cape Breton Regional Municipality